Sun Rui (born 14 July 1999) is a Chinese footballer currently playing as a midfielder for Wuxi Wugou.

Career statistics

Club
.

References

1999 births
Living people
Chinese footballers
Association football midfielders
China League Two players
China League One players
Shandong Taishan F.C. players
Zibo Cuju F.C. players
Inner Mongolia Zhongyou F.C. players
21st-century Chinese people